Priscus is the Latin word for "ancient" or "venerable." There were several figures in Antiquity named Priscus:

Priscus of Panium, 5th-century historian
Priscus Attalus, senator and briefly Emperor
Priscus of Epirus, 4th-century Neoplatonist philosopher and friend of the emperor Julian
Marcus Statius Priscus, 2nd-century Roman general and politician
Caerellius Priscus, governor of Roman Britain in the 170s
Gaius Julius Priscus, Roman usurper
Priscus (magister militum), Byzantine general of the late 6th/early 7th centuries
Helvidius Priscus, Stoic philosopher
Tarquinius Priscus, legendary king of Rome
Clutorius Priscus, Roman poet
Priscus (gladiator), 1st-century Roman gladiator
 Saint Priscus
Iavolenus Priscus, 1st-century Roman jurist
Titus Julius Priscus, 3rd-century Roman governor and usurper
Priscus of Lyon (d. in the 580s), bishop of Lyon

Other uses
Bison priscus, a Pleistocene species of Bison from Eurasia
13653 Priscus, an asteroid